State Route 431 (SR 431), commonly known as the Mount Rose Highway, is a  highway in Washoe County, Nevada, that connects Incline Village at Lake Tahoe with Reno. The highway, a Nevada Scenic Byway, takes its name from Mount Rose, which lies just off the highway. Prior to 1976, the highway existed as State Route 27.

Route description

The highway begins along the northeast shore of Lake Tahoe in the city of Incline Village, at an intersection with SR 28. The highway scales the Carson Range, a spur range of the Sierra Nevada, until reaching a meadow that is used as an access for the Mount Rose Wilderness. Along the western ascent is a view area with directional markers pointing to several notable peaks in the Sierra Nevada range that surround Lake Tahoe. The highway crests the Carson Range at Mount Rose Summit. The Nevada Department of Transportation has claimed in several places this is the highest summit open year-round in the Sierra Nevada mountain range, . Both the east and west approach to the summit feature hairpin curves.

On the eastern approach to the summit, the highway passes by the Mount Rose Ski Area and features overlooks with views of both Reno and the Washoe Valley. After several serpentine bends the highway arrives at an area of Reno called Galena. In Galena, the highway has a junction with Interstate 580 and US 395. It terminates at a junction with US 395 Alt. and SR 341, which continues towards Virginia City.

History

The road has existed at least as far back as 1950 as an access to the ski areas of Mount Rose. At that time it was a dirt road only passable by automobile in the summer months.

Approximately  of SR 431 was designated as the Mount Rose Nevada Scenic Byway by the Nevada Department of Transportation on June 27, 1996.

Rapid growth in the Reno area has put strain on the corridor served by the highway. This has prompted environmentalists to push for restrictions on future development along the corridor.

Major intersections

See also

References

External links

 TravelNevada - Mt. Rose Scenic Byway

431
431
Transportation in Washoe County, Nevada